Everything Is Gonna Work Out Fine is an album by dobro player Jerry Douglas, released in 1987. It contains all the tracks from his two releases on the Rounder label — Fluxology and Fluxedo — except for "Say a Little Prayer for You".

Track listing
 "Fluxology" (Jerry Douglas) – 3:06
 "Randy Lynn Rag" (Earl Scruggs) – 2:19
 "Bill Cheatham" (Traditional) – 3:03
 "C-Biscuit" (Douglas) – 3:30
 "Wheel Hoss" (Bill Monroe) – 2:24
 "Alabam" – 2:53
 "Dixie Hoedown" (Jimmy Lunsford, Don Reno) – 1:53
 "Red Bud Rag" (Douglas) – 2:59
 "Blues for Vickie" (Douglas) – 1:02
 "Nite Crawler" (Douglas) – 3:26
 "Tennessee Fluxedo" (Douglas) – 4:51
 "Sunny Skies" (James Taylor) – 3:01
 "Intro"  – 4:03
 "Tell Her Lies (and Feed Her Candy)" (Joe McCracken) – 2:13
 "Birth of the Blues" (Lew Brown, Buddy DeSylva, Ray Henderson) – 3:35
 "Cincinnati Rag" (David Franklin) – 2:28
 "Panhandle Rag" (Leon McAuliffe) – 4:54
 "Ben Dewberry's Final Run" (Andrew Jenkins) – 3:44
 "I Think It's Gonna Work Out Fine" (Robert Lee McCoy, Sylvia McKinney) – 4:15

Personnel
Darol Anger – fiddle
Russ Barenberg – guitar
Terry Baucom – fiddle
Steve "Hood" Bryant – bass
Sam Bush – mandolin, fiddle, slide mandolin
Jerry Douglas – resonator guitar, vocals
Béla Fleck – banjo
Phil Gazell – harmonica
Wes Golding – guitar
Jack Hicks – banjo
David Parmley – guitar
Todd Phillips – bass
Tony Rice – guitar
Mark Schatz – bass
Ricky Skaggs – mandolin, fiddle, guitar
Bobby Slone – bass
Cheryl Warren – bass
Buck White – piano, mandolin
Sharon White – guitar

References

Jerry Douglas albums
1987 compilation albums
Rounder Records compilation albums